USS Kenmore may refer to the following ships of the United States Navy:

 , was converted to a hospital ship and renamed Refuge 2 September 1943 then sold for scrap, 2 February 1948
 , was acquired by the US Navy and commissioned 14 November 1943 and returned to her owner 1 February 1946

United States Navy ship names